Sileshi Sihine (Amharic: ስለሺ ስህኔ; born January 29, 1983, in Sheno) is a retired Ethiopian long-distance runner.

Sileshi won silver medals in the 10,000 metres at both the 2004 Athens Olympics and the 2008 Beijing Olympics as well as at the 2005 World Championships and 2007 World Championships as well as a bronze medal in 2003. He also picked up a silver medal in the 5000 m at the 2005 World Championships.

Career

Junior career
Sileshi began running at school, inspired by the achievements of compatriot Haile Gebrselassie.

After success at the junior level, he emerged as a leading senior athlete.

2002-2003
In cross country, he won the Cross Internacional de Venta de Baños in 2002 and 2003.

Sileshi was one of the three Ethiopians, along with Kenenisa Bekele and Gebrselassie, who swept the gold, silver, and bronze medals in the 10,000 metres at the 2003 World Championships in Paris. Sihine then won the 10,000 metres at the 2003 Afro-Asian Games.

2004
Sileshi won a bronze medal at the World Cross Country Championships. He also won a silver medal in the 10,000 metres at the Summer Olympic Gamess in Athens, behind Bekele.

2005
Sileshi won a silver medal in the 10,000 metres, behind Bekele, and the silver medal in the 5000 metres at the World Championships in Helsinki, Finland.

2006
At the World Cross Country Championships, Sileshi finished second behind Bekele.

2007
At the World Championships in Osaka, Sileshi took the silver medal in the 10,000 metres, again finishing behind Bekele.

2008
He yet again took a silver medal in the 10,000 metres behind Bekele at the Summer Olympic Games in Beijing, China.

2011
In May, Sileshi finished fifth in the 5000 metres at the Samsung DL Golden Gala in Rome, Italy.

Nine days later at the Prefontaine Classic 10,000 metres
in Eugene, Oregon, he finished in sixth place, 6.27 seconds behind winner Mohamed Farah.

Sileshi attempted his first marathon race at the Amsterdam Marathon, but dropped out after 36 kilometres.

2012
On 7 June, Sileshi finished seventh in the 5000 metres at the ExxonMobil Bislett Games in Oslo, Norway. Two weeks later at a 10 kilometre road race in Birmingham, U.K., Sihine finished fourth, just 1.06 seconds behind Bekele, the winner.

2015
In February, he was elected president of the newly formed Ethiopian Athletes’ Association.

Personal life
Sileshi Sihine is married to three-time Olympic champion athlete Tirunesh Dibaba. Their wedding was broadcast live on national television.

Achievements

Personal bests
The following are his personal bests:

References

External links

IAAF Focus on Athletes article

1983 births
Living people
Sportspeople from Oromia Region
Ethiopian male long-distance runners
Athletes (track and field) at the 2004 Summer Olympics
Athletes (track and field) at the 2008 Summer Olympics
Olympic athletes of Ethiopia
Olympic silver medalists for Ethiopia
World Athletics Championships medalists
Medalists at the 2008 Summer Olympics
Medalists at the 2004 Summer Olympics
Olympic silver medalists in athletics (track and field)
African Games gold medalists for Ethiopia
African Games medalists in athletics (track and field)
Athletes (track and field) at the 2003 All-Africa Games
21st-century Ethiopian people